Videxport, S.A. de C.V., operating as Videxport, is a privately held company founded in 1975, in Hermosillo, Mexico by Gilberto Salazar Serrano, the father of current owner, Gilberto Salazar Escoboza. The company produces popular varieties of fruits and nuts, including seedless watermelons, seedless table grapes, and several hues of bell peppers during periods of the year when such items are not available locally in destination markets. The majority of Videxport products are distributed to the United States and Canada. All bell pepper crops are exported to the United States and Canada, while 98% percent of its watermelons are exported to the United States. However, the company distributes to markets in Europe and Asia as well. Approximately 90% of the production distributed via The Giumarra Companies to major retailers in the United States, Canada, England and Asia with the brand called Nature´s Partner.

History

Videxport was founded in the 1970s by Gilberto Salazar Escoboza's father, Gilberto Salazar Serrano, as a family-owned and operated business. In 1987, at the age of 23, Gilberto Salazar Escoboza took over the business, later expanding the company into the one of the leading positions in the industry.

Products

The company specializes in growing, packaging, and shipping table grapes, watermelons, pecans, and bell peppers. The majority of the production, apart from distributing their products locally, is distributed to markets in the United States, Canada, England, and Asia.

Food safety

After the Food and Drug Administration and Mexico's Federal Commission for the Protection from Sanitary Risks (COFEPRIS) and its National Service for Agro-Alimentary Public Health, Safety and Quality (SENASICA) signed a statement of intent that formed a partnership among the three organizations in July 2014, agricultural business owners made it their commitment to not only meet, but to exceed the more stringent food safety standards.

Government agencies in both Mexico and the U.S. now issue GAPs, or guidelines to good agricultural practices, for the production and distribution of specific crops and agricultural products. Videxport and Empacadora Frutícola Santa Inés, the packaging arm of the company, work proactively to maintain food safety and integrity.

Whether it is providing high quality workers’ accommodations or establishing sanitary practices in and around growing and processing areas, Videxport and Empacadora Frutícola Santa Inés continue to strictly adhere to and implement the guidelines for GAPs that promote superior food quality and safety. As a result, the companies have received several certifications and recognitions for their efforts and dedication.

Certification

The companies have received inspection and certification by a number of bodies, including:

 PrimusGSF
 GlobalG.A.P.
 SENASICA
 Mexico Supreme Quality
 Customs-Trade Partnership Against Terrorism (C-TPAT)
 Fair Trade

Associations

Gilberto Salazar Escoboza and his companies belong to several associations related to the agricultural community in Mexico, including:

 Asociación Agrícola Local de Productores de Uva de Mesa (AALPUM)
 Asociación Agrícola Local de Productores de Hortalizas, Frutas y Legumbres de Hermosillo, A.C.
 Asociación de Usuarios del Distrito de Riego 051, Costa de Hermosillo, A.C.
 Productora de Nuez S.P.R. de R.I
 Asociación de Productores de Hortalizas del Valle de Guaymas y Empalme
 Asociación de Organismos de Agricultores del Norte de Sonora (AOANS)
 Asociación de Productores Agrícolas de Sonora (APAS)

See also

 List of companies of Mexico

References

External links
 
 Gilberto Salazar Escoboza website

1970 establishments in Mexico
Agriculture companies of Mexico